The Jouanne is a  long river in western France located in the department of Mayenne, region of Pays de la Loire. It is a tributary of the river Mayenne on the left side, and so is a sub-tributary of the Loire by Mayenne and Maine.

History 

The name of Jouanne probably goes back to the Gaulish form div-onna (divine-water). The evolution of Divonne is exactly the same as that of divrnus which engendered day in modern French.

Gallery

References

External links 
 Navigation details for 80 French rivers and canals (French waterways website section)

Rivers of France
Rivers of Mayenne
Rivers of Pays de la Loire